The Bengal Championships was a combined men's and women's grass court tournament founded in 1887 as the Bengal Lawn Tennis Championships then the second oldest tournament in India. The tournament was played at the Calcutta Cricket Club grounds, Calcutta, West Bengal, India. The championships ran until 1979 before it was discontinued.

History
Tennis was introduuced to India in 1880s by British Army and Civilian Officers. In 1887 the Bengal Lawn Tennis Championships was inaugurated at Calcutta. British players initially dominated the tennis tournaments in India. In 1917 Mr. N.S. Nyer became the first Indian to win the men's singles championship. The championships ran until 1970 but were discontiuned

Venue
The first edition of the championships was played at the Calcutta Cricket Club (f.1792) grounds.

References

Defunct tennis tournaments in India
Grass court tennis tournaments